Cornelius "Kees" Claudius Henricus van Ierssel (born 6 December 1945, Breda) is a Dutch former footballer who played as a defender.

During his club career he played for FC Twente from 1969 to 1979. He earned 6 caps for the Netherlands national football team, and was part of the squad that finished as runners-up in the 1974 FIFA World Cup.

References

External links

Biography

1945 births
Living people
Dutch footballers
Netherlands international footballers
Eredivisie players
1974 FIFA World Cup players
FC Twente players
Footballers from Breda
Association football defenders